Dexter is a city in Cowley County, Kansas, United States.  As of the 2020 census, the population of the city was 224.

History
The first post office at Dexter was established in July, 1870.

Dexter was platted in 1875. Dexter is named for a trotting horse belonging to Robert Bonner of New York.

Early in the 20th century Dexter became the focus of research that would confirm the existence of an abundance of naturally occurring and readily available helium. In May 1903, a newly drilled natural gas well was found to contain a nonflammable gas. Researchers at the University of Kansas found the “Dexter gas” contained only 15 percent methane and 72 percent nitrogen, causing the gas to be nonflammable. In addition they discovered helium within an “inert residue” in the gas and, after expanding their research to other wells throughout Kansas, Missouri, and Oklahoma, published a paper in 1907 saying that helium could be extracted from natural gas. Helium did not have any practical applications at the time, but by 1917 the federal government was sponsoring extensive research into the possibility of using helium in airships.

Geography
Dexter is located at  (37.179373, -96.715987).

Climate
The climate in this area is characterized by hot, humid summers and generally mild to cool winters.  According to the Köppen Climate Classification system, Dexter has a humid subtropical climate, abbreviated "Cfa" on climate maps.

Area events
 Blackdog Festival, celebrates the historic Black Dog Trail, also known as the Great Osage Trail, created by Osage Indian natives.

Area attractions
 The "Oh Henry!" Candy Bar was invented by a man named Tom Henry of Arkansas City, whose family now runs a candy factory on route K-15 in Dexter, Kansas called "Henry's Candies".  The factory sells "Momma Henry" bars, which are near identical to the original "Oh Henry!" candy bar.
 Cowley Lake Waterfall

Demographics

2010 census
As of the census of 2010, there were 278 people, 105 households, and 77 families residing in the city. The racial makeup of the city was 95.3% White, 3.6% Native American, 0.4% Pacific Islander, and 0.7% from two or more races. Hispanic or Latino of any race were 0.7% of the population.

There were 105 households, of which 32.4% had children under the age of 18 living with them, 58.1% were married couples living together, 9.5% had a female householder with no husband present, 5.7% had a male householder with no wife present, and 26.7% were non-families. 23.8% of all households were made up of individuals, and 13.3% had someone living alone who was 65 years of age or older. The average household size was 2.36 and the average family size was 2.78.

The median age in the city was 47.4 years. 20.5% of residents were under the age of 18; 6.8% were between the ages of 18 and 24; 19.8% were from 25 to 44; 27.1% were from 45 to 64; and 25.9% were 65 years of age or older. The gender makeup of the city was 47.8% male and 52.2% female.

2000 census
According to the census of 2000, there were 364 people, 119 households, and 81 families residing in the city. The racial makeup of the city was 92.03% White, 0.27% African American, 5.22% Native American, 0.82% from other races, and 1.65% from two or more races. Hispanic or Latino of any race were 1.10% of the population.

There were 119 households, out of which 38.7% had children under the age of 18 living with them, 59.7% were married couples living together, 5.9% had a female householder with no husband present, and 31.1% were non-families. 25.2% of all households were made up of individuals, and 10.1% had someone living alone who was 65 years of age or older. The average household size was 2.73 and the average family size was 3.43.

In the city, the population was spread out, with 28.0% under the age of 18, 6.3% from 18 to 24, 26.6% from 25 to 44, 20.6% from 45 to 64, and 18.4% who were 65 years of age or older. The median age was 38 years. For every 100 females, there were 87.6 males. For every 100 females age 18 and over, there were 83.2 males.

The median income for a household in the city was $32,656, and the median income for a family was $39,286. Males had a median income of $25,536 versus $18,125 for females. The per capita income for the city was $12,615. About 14.1% of families and 16.4% of the population were below the poverty line, including 23.4% of those under age 18 and 6.9% of those age 65 or over.

Education
The community is served by Dexter USD 471 public school district.

See also
 Lighthouse Library

References

Further reading

 McCool, John H. This Week in KU History: December 7, 1905 “High On Helium”. Detailing the discovery of helium by KU's chemistry professors.

External links
 Dexter - Directory of Public Officials
 , from Hatteberg's People on KAKE TV news
 Cowley County map, KDOT

Cities in Kansas
Cities in Cowley County, Kansas
Populated places established in 1875
1875 establishments in Kansas